Félix Asdrúbal Padrón Hernández (born 13 March 1991), simply known as Asdrúbal, is a Spanish professional footballer who plays as either a winger or a forward for UD Tamaraceite.

Football career
Born in Las Palmas, Canary Islands, Asdrúbal finished his formation with UD Las Palmas, and made his senior debuts with the reserves in 2010–11 season.

On 3 July 2013 Asdrúbal renewed his link with the club, until 2015. On 31 August he made his debut as a professional, coming on as a second half substitute and scoring the last in 1–1 home draw against SD Eibar.

In August 2014, after appearing in 34 matches and scoring five goals in the 2013–14 campaign, Asdrúbal was definitely promoted to the main squad and was handed the number 9 jersey. On 15 July of the following year, after winning promotion to La Liga, he signed a new three-year deal with the club.

On 24 January 2016, after making no league appearances during the season, Asdrúbal was loaned to second level's CD Leganés until June. After another top level promotion he returned to his parent club, and was handed the number 25 jersey after a loan to Elche CF fell through.

Asdrúbal made his debut in the main category of Spanish football on 1 October 2016, replacing Aythami Artiles in a 2–2 away draw against CA Osasuna. The following 3 January he rescinded his contract, and joined Thai Premier League side Port F.C. the following day.

On 28 July 2017, Asdrúbal joined Australian club Central Coast Mariners FC on a one-year contract. He scored his first goal for the club on debut in the first round of the 2017–18 A-League season against rivals Newcastle Jets FC, but in a 1–5 loss; after 11 appearances, he was released.

On 20 January 2018, Asdrúbal signed a two-and-a-half-year contract with AD Alcorcón in the second division. Roughly one year later, he moved to third division side Salamanca CF on loan until June.

On 9 July 2019, after returning from loan, Asdrúbal terminated his contract with the Alfareros.

References

External links

1991 births
Living people
Footballers from Las Palmas
Spanish footballers
Association football wingers
Association football forwards
La Liga players
Segunda División players
Segunda División B players
Tercera División players
UD Las Palmas Atlético players
UD Las Palmas players
CD Leganés players
AD Alcorcón footballers
Salamanca CF UDS players
UD Tamaraceite footballers
Asdrubal Padron
A-League Men players
Central Coast Mariners FC players
Spanish expatriate footballers
Spanish expatriate sportspeople in Thailand
Spanish expatriate sportspeople in Australia
Expatriate footballers in Thailand
Expatriate soccer players in Australia